Region A may refer to:

 Region A of the IALA Maritime Buoyage System
 Region A of the Blu-ray disc storage system 
 Occator Crater on Ceres, known as "Region A" from ground-based images from the Keck Observatory.